Stow Fair was an English medieval fair inaugurated in 1233 and held at Stow Green Hill in Lincolnshire. 

The Prior of Sempringham was granted permission in 1268 to hold this annual fair, from 23 to 25 June, confirming an earlier charter. The fair continued until living memory, being run as a horse fair until 1954.

It seems likely that earlier fairs were held on the same days, one of which is the feast day of St Ætheldreda, long associated with the site. Historian Graham Platts' view is that there should be scepticism over a belief that the fair developed from earlier summer solstice rites.

The North Kesteven Council has erected an information board at the site, with historical text and a photograph of the horse fair in 1908.

Location

Stow Fair was held at the now Stow Green Hill, next to Mareham Lane between Sleaford and Rippingale via Threekingham.  This, is thought to be the route of a Roman Road aligned with King Street.

The location is on the edge of the Limestone hills, looking North over the fen country toward Sleaford. It is toward the end of a small ridge of high ground pushing east into the fen from Walcott. It would have been a commanding position at the time.

A nearby farm is called Stow Farm, and the lane into Horbling is called Stow Lane.  The area is signposted "Stow" from the A15 at Threekingham

Few Roman remains have been found along the route of Mareham Lane.

A fenced field at the corner of Mareham Lane and Stow Lane bears a notice board with historical information.  The land is owned by the Crown Commissioners and farmed under a tenancy.  Pedestrian access to the site is permitted, although metal detection is forbidden.  Originally the fair could have extended over a larger area, and the field is a Scheduled Ancient Monument.

See also

References

 Some information about the fair is from a notice board erected at the site.

1233 establishments in England
Annual fairs
Archaeological sites in Lincolnshire
Christianity in Anglo-Saxon England
Fairs in England
Recurring events established in 1233
Recurring events disestablished in 1954
North Kesteven District
1954 disestablishments in England
Festivals established in 1233
 Charter fair